These monasteries were dissolved by King Henry VIII of England in the Dissolution of the Monasteries. The list is by no means exhaustive, since over 800 religious houses existed before the Reformation, and virtually every town, of any size, had at least one abbey, priory, convent or friary in it. (Often many small houses of monks, nuns, canons or friars.)

See also
Dissolution of the Lesser Monasteries Act
Second Act of Dissolution
List of monastic houses in England
List of monastic houses in Wales
List of monastic houses in Ireland
[[List o manostic casa en du pales de galles

References

Henry VIII
List